War of the Priests may refer to:
 War of the Priests (Poland), a 15th-century war in Poland
  or War of the Priests, a 19th-century conflict in Honduras